The 2021 SWAC women's basketball tournament was a postseason women's basketball tournament taking place March 10–13, 2021. The tournament was held at Bartow Arena in Birmingham, Alabama. Jackson State received the Southwestern Athletic Conference's automatic bid to the 2021 NCAA Division I women's basketball tournament.

Unlike most NCAA Division I basketball conference tournaments, the SWAC tournament does not include all of the league's teams. The tournament instead features only the top eight teams from regular-season SWAC play.

Seeds

Schedule
All tournament games are streamed on ESPN3.

Bracket

See also
 2021 SWAC men's basketball tournament

References

2020–21 Southwestern Athletic Conference women's basketball season
SWAC women's basketball tournament
Basketball competitions in Birmingham, Alabama
College basketball tournaments in Alabama
SWAC women's basketball tournament
SWAC women's basketball tournament
Women's sports in Alabama